In many languages, the names given to the seven days of the week are derived from the names of the classical planets in Hellenistic astronomy, which were in turn named after contemporary deities, a system introduced by the Sumerians and later adopted by the Babylonians from whom the Roman Empire adopted the system during Late Antiquity. In some other languages, the days are named after corresponding deities of the regional culture, beginning either with Sunday or with Monday. The seven-day week was adopted in early Christianity from the Hebrew calendar, who copied it from the Babylonians and gradually replaced the Roman nundinal cycle Sunday remained the first day of the week, being considered the day of the sun god Sol Invictus and official use in 321 CE, making the Day of the Sun a legal holiday.

In the international standard ISO 8601, Monday is treated as the first day of the week.

Days named after planets

Greco-Roman tradition 

Between the 1st and 3rd centuries CE, the Roman Empire gradually replaced the eight-day Roman nundinal cycle with the seven-day week.
The earliest evidence for this new system is a Pompeiian graffito referring to 6 February (ante diem viii idus Februarias) of the year 60 CE as dies solis ("Sunday").
Another early witness is a reference to a lost treatise by Plutarch, written in about CE 100, which addressed the question of: "Why are the days named after the planets reckoned in a different order from the 'actual' order?". (The treatise is lost, but the answer to the question is known; see planetary hours).

The Ptolemaic system of planetary spheres asserts that the order of the heavenly bodies, from the farthest to the closest to the Earth  is: Saturn, Jupiter, Mars, Sun, Venus, Mercury, Moon, or, objectively, the planets are ordered from slowest to fastest moving as they appear in the night sky.

The days were named after the planets of Hellenistic astrology, in the order: Sun (Helios), Moon (Selene), Mars (Ares), Mercury (Hermes), Jupiter (Zeus), Venus (Aphrodite) and Saturn (Cronos).

The seven-day week spread throughout the Roman Empire in Late Antiquity.
By the 4th century, it was in wide use throughout the Empire. 

The Greek and Latin names are as follows:

Romance languages 
Except for Modern Portuguese, Galician and Mirandese, the Romance languages preserved the Latin names, except for the names of Sunday, which was replaced by [dies] Dominicus (Dominica), that is, "the Lord's Day", and of Saturday, which was named for the Sabbath. Mirandese and  Modern Portuguese use numbered weekdays (see below), but retain sábado and demingo/domingo for weekends.

Celtic languages 
Early Old Irish adopted the names from Latin, but introduced separate terms of Norse origin for Wednesday, Thursday and Friday, then later supplanted these with terms relating to church fasting practices.

Adoptions from Romance 
Albanian adopted the Latin terms for Tuesday, Wednesday and Saturday, adopted translations of the Latin terms for Sunday and Monday, and kept native terms for Thursday and Friday. Other languages adopted the week together with the Latin (Romance) names for the days of the week in the colonial period. Several constructed languages also adopted the Latin terminology.

With the exception of sabato, the Esperanto names are all from French, cf. French dimanche, lundi, mardi, mercredi, jeudi, vendredi.

Germanic tradition 

The date of the introduction of this system is not known exactly, but it must have happened later than CE 200 but before the introduction of Christianity during the 6th to 7th centuries, i.e., during the final phase or soon after the collapse of the Western Roman Empire. This period is later than the Common Germanic stage, but still during the phase of undifferentiated West Germanic. The names of the days of the week in North Germanic languages were not calqued from Latin directly, but taken from the West Germanic names.
 Sunday: Old English , meaning "sun's day". This is a translation of the Latin phrase . English, like most of the Germanic languages, preserves the day's association with the sun. Many other European languages, including all of the Romance languages, have changed its name to the equivalent of "the Lord's day" (based on Ecclesiastical Latin ). In both West Germanic and North Germanic mythology, the Sun is personified as Sunna/Sól.
 Monday: Old English , meaning "Moon's day". This is equivalent to the Latin name . In North Germanic mythology, the Moon is personified as Máni.
 Tuesday: Old English , meaning "Tiw's day". Tiw (Norse ) was a one-handed god associated with single combat and pledges in Norse mythology and also attested prominently in wider Germanic paganism. The name of the day is also related to the Latin name , "Day of Mars" (the Roman god of war).
 Wednesday: Old English  meaning the day of the Germanic god Woden (known as Óðinn among the North Germanic peoples), and a prominent god of the Anglo-Saxons (and other Germanic peoples) in England until about the seventh century. This corresponds to the Latin counterpart , "Day of Mercury", as both are deities of magic and knowledge. The German Mittwoch, the Low German , the miðviku- in Icelandic  and the Finnish  all mean "mid-week".
 Thursday: Old English , meaning ''s day'.  means thunder or its personification, the Norse god known in Modern English as Thor. Similarly Dutch , German  ('thunder's day'), Finnish , and Scandinavian  ('Thor's day'). "Thor's day" corresponds to Latin , "day of Jupiter" (the Roman god of thunder).
 Friday: Old English , meaning the day of the Anglo-Saxon goddess . It is based on the Latin , "Day of Venus".
 Saturday: named after the Roman god Saturn associated with the Titan Cronus, father of Zeus and many Olympians. The Nordic laugardagur, leygardagur, laurdag, etc. deviate significantly as they have no reference to either the Norse or the Roman pantheon; they derive from Old Nordic , literally "washing-day". The German  (mainly used in northern and eastern Germany) and the Low German  mean "Sunday Eve"; the German word  derives from the name for Shabbat.

Adoptions from Germanic

Hindu tradition 

Hindu astrology uses the concept of days under the regency of a planet under the term vāsara/vāra, the days of the week being called sūrya-/ravi-, chandra-/soma-, maṅgala-, budha-, guru-/bṛhaspati-, śukra-, and śani-vāsara. śukrá is a name of Venus (regarded as a son of Bhṛgu); guru is here a title of Bṛhaspati, and hence of Jupiter; budha "Mercury" is regarded as a son of Soma, that is, the Moon. Knowledge of Greek astrology existed since about the 2nd century BCE, but references to the vāsara occur somewhat later, during the Gupta period (Yājñavalkya Smṛti, c. 3rd to 5th century CE), that is, at roughly the same period or before the system was introduced in the Roman Empire.

In languages of the Indian subcontinent

Southeast Asian languages 
The Southeast Asian tradition also uses the Hindu names of the days of the week. Hindu astrology adopted the concept of days under the regency of a planet under the term vāra, the days of the week being called āditya-, soma-, maṅgala-, budha-, guru-, śukra-, and śani-vāra. śukrá is a name of Venus (regarded as a son of Bhṛgu); guru is here a title of Bṛhaspati, and hence of Jupiter; budha "Mercury" is regarded as a son of Soma, that is, the Moon.

Northeast Asian languages

East Asian tradition 
The East Asian naming system for the days of the week closely parallels that of the Latin system and is ordered after the "Seven Luminaries" (七曜 qī yào), which consists of the Sun, Moon and the five planets visible to the naked eye.

The Chinese had apparently adopted the seven-day week from the Hellenistic system by the 4th century CE, although by which route is not entirely clear. It was again transmitted to China in the 8th century CE by Manichaeans, via the country of Kang (a Central Asian polity near Samarkand).
The 4th-century CE date, according to the Cihai encyclopedia, is due to a reference to Fan Ning (范寧), an astrologer of the Jin Dynasty. The renewed adoption from Manichaeans in the 8th century CE (Tang Dynasty) is documented with the writings of the Chinese Buddhist monk Yijing and the Ceylonese Buddhist monk Bu Kong.

The Chinese transliteration of the planetary system was soon brought to Japan by the Japanese monk Kobo Daishi; surviving diaries of the Japanese statesman Fujiwara no Michinaga show the seven-day system in use in Heian Period Japan as early as 1007. In Japan, the seven-day system was kept in use (for astrological purposes) until its promotion to a full-fledged (Western-style) calendrical basis during the Meiji era. In China, with the founding of the Republic of China in 1911, Monday through Saturday in China are now named after the luminaries implicitly with the numbers.

Pronunciations for Classical Chinese names are given in Standard Chinese.

Numbered days of the week

Days numbered from Monday 
The ISO prescribes Monday as the first day of the week with ISO-8601 for software date formats.

The Slavic, Baltic and Uralic languages (except Finnish and partially Estonian and Võro) adopted numbering but took Monday rather than Sunday as the "first day". This convention is also found in some Austronesian languages whose speakers were converted to Christianity by European missionaries.

In Slavic languages, some of the names correspond to numerals after Sunday: compare Russian vtornik "Tuesday" and vtoroj "the second", chetverg "Thursday" and chetvjortyj "the fourth", pyatnitsa "Friday" and pyatyj "the fifth"; see also the Notes.

{| cellspacing="1" style="width:100%;" class="wikitable"
|-
!  style="width:16%;"| DayNumber From One
! style="width:12%;"| MondayDay One
! style="width:12%;"| TuesdayDay Two
! style="width:12%;"| WednesdayDay Three
! style="width:12%;"| ThursdayDay Four
! style="width:12%;"| FridayDay Five
! style="width:12%;"| SaturdayDay Six
! style="width:12%;"| SundayDay Seven
|-
! Developer
| 1
| 2
| 3
| 4
| 5
| 6
| 0
|-
! ISO 8601 #
| 1
| 2
| 3
| 4
| 5
| 6
| 7
|-
! Russian
| понедельник  ponedel'nik 
| вторник  vtornik 
| среда  sreda 
| четверг  chetverg 
| пятница  pyatnitsa 
| суббота  subbota 
| воскресенье  voskresen'ye 
|-
! Belarusian
| панядзелак  panyadzelak 
| аўторак  awtorak 
| серада   serada 
| чацвер  chats'ver 
| пятніца  pyatnitsa 
| субота  subota 
| нядзеля  nyadzelya 
|-
! Ukrainian
| понедiлок  ponedilok 
| вiвторок  vivtorok 
| середа  sereda 
| четвер  chetver 
| п'ятниця  p'yatnytsya 
| субота  subota 
| недiля  nedilya 
|-
! Lemko Rusyn
| понедільок ponedilyok
| віторок vitorok 
| середа sereda
| четвер chetver
| пятниця pyatnîtsya
| субота subota
| неділя nedilya
|-
! Prešov Rusyn
| понедїлёк ponedyilyok
| вівторок vivtorok 
| середа sereda
| четверь ''chetver| пятніця pyatnitsya
| субота subota
| недїля nedyilya
|-
! Pannonian Rusyn
| пондзелок pondzelok
| вовторок vovtorok 
| стрeдa streda
| штвaртoк shtvartok
| пияток piyatok
| сoбoтa sobota
| нєдзеля nyedzelya
|-
! Slovak
| pondelok 
| utorok 
| streda 
| štvrtok 
| piatok 
| sobota 
| nedeľa 
|-
! Czech
| pondělí 
| úterý 
| středa 
| čtvrtek 
| pátek 
| sobota 
| neděle 
|-
! Upper Sorbian
| póndźela 
| wutora 
| srjeda 
| štwórtk 
| pjatk 
| sobota 
| njedźela 
|-
! Lower Sorbian
| pónjeźela, pónjeźele
| wałtora 
| srjoda
| stwórtk
| pětk
| sobota
| njeźela, njeźelka
|-
! Polish
| poniedziałek 
| wtorek 
| środa 
| czwartek 
| piątek 
| sobota 
| niedziela 
|-
! Kashubian
| pòniedzôłk
| wtórk
| strzoda
| czwiôrtk
| piątk
| sobòta
| niedzela
|-
! Slovene
| ponedeljek 
| torek 
| sreda 
| četrtek 
| petek 
| sobota 
| nedelja 
|-
! Burgenland Croatian
| pandiljak, ponediljak
| utorak 
| srijeda
| četvrtak
| petak 
| subota
| nedilja
|-
! rowspan="3"|Serbo-Croatian (Ijekavian/Ekavian/Ikavian)
| ponedjeljak, понедјељак 
| rowspan="3"|utorak, уторак 
| srijeda, сриједа 
| rowspan="3"|četvrtak, четвртак 
| rowspan="3"|petak, петак 
| rowspan="3"|subota, субота 
| nedjelja, недјеља 
|-
| понедељак, ponedeljak 
| среда, sreda 
| недеља, nedelja 
|-
| ponediljak, понедилјак 
| srida, срида 
| nedilja, недилја 
|-
! Macedonian
| понеделник  ponedelnik 
| вторник  vtornik 
| среда  sreda 
| четврток  chetvrtok 
| петок  petok 
| сабота  sabota 
| недела  nedela 
|-
! Bulgarian
| понеделник  ponedelnik 
| вторник  vtornik 
| сряда  sryada 
| четвъртък  chetvărtăk 
| петък  petăk 
| събота  săbota 
| неделя  nedelya 
|-
! Interslavic
| ponedělok, понедєлок 
| vtorok, второк 
| srěda, срєда 
| četvrtok, четврток 
| petok, петок 
| subota, субота 
| nedělja, недєлја 
|-
! Lithuanian
| pirmadienis
| antradienis
| trečiadienis
| ketvirtadienis
| penktadienis 
| šeštadienis
| sekmadienis
|-
! Latvian
| pirmdiena
| otrdiena
| trešdiena
| ceturtdiena 
| piektdiena 
| sestdiena
| svētdiena
|-
! Hungarian
| hétfő 
| kedd 
| szerda  Slavic
| csütörtök  Slavic
| péntek  Slavic
| szombat  Hebrew
| vasárnap 
|-
! Estonian
| esmaspäev 
| teisipäev 
| kolmapäev 
| neljapäev 
| reede 
| laupäev
| pühapäev
|-
! Võro
| iispäiv 
| tõõsõpäiv 
| kolmapäiv 
| nelläpäiv 
| riidi 
| puuľpäiv
| pühäpäiv
|-
! Mongolian  (numerical)
| нэг дэх өдөр  neg dekh ödör
| хоёр дахь өдөр  hoyor dahi ödör
| гурав дахь өдөр  gurav dahi ödör
| дөрөв дэх өдөр  döröv dekh ödör
| тав дахь өдөр  tav dahi ödör
| хагас сайн өдөр  hagas sayn ödör 
| бүтэн сайн өдөр  büten sayn ödör 
|-
! Luo
| Wuok tich
| Tich ariyo
| Tich adek
| Tich ang'uen
| Tich abich
| Chieng' ngeso
| Juma pil
|-
! Tok Pisin (Melanesian Pidgin)
| mande
| tunde
| trinde
| fonde
| fraide
| sarere
| sande
|-
! Apma (Vanuatu)
| ren bwaleh / mande
| ren karu
| ren katsil
| ren kavet
| ren kalim
| lesaare
| sande
|}

In Standard Chinese, the week is referred to as the "Stellar Period" or "Cycle".

The modern Chinese names for the days of the week are based on a simple numerical sequence. The word for "week" is followed by a number indicating the day: "Monday" is literally the "Stellar Period One"/"Cycle One", that is, the "First day of the Stellar Period/Cycle", etc. The exception is Sunday, where 日 (rì), "day" or "Sun", is used instead of a number. A slightly informal and colloquial variant to 日 is 天 (tiān) "day", "sky" or "heaven".

Accordingly, the notational abbreviation of the days of the week uses the numbers, for example, 一 for "M" or "Mon(.)", "Monday". Note that the abbreviation of Sunday uses exclusively 日 and not 天. Attempted usage of 天 as such will not be understood.

Colloquially, the week is also known as the "Prayer", with the names of the days of the week formed accordingly.

The following is a table of the Mandarin names of the days of the weeks. Note that standard Taiwan Mandarin pronounces 期 as qí, so 星期 is instead xīngqí. While all varieties of Mandarin may pronounce 星期 as xīngqi and 禮拜/礼拜 as lǐbai, the second syllable with the neutral tone, this is not reflected in the table either for legibility.

Several Sinitic languages refer to Saturday as 週末 "end of the week" and Sunday as 禮拜. Examples include Shenyang Mandarin, Hanyuan Sichuanese Mandarin, Taishanese, Yudu Hakka, Teochew, Ningbonese, and Loudi Old Xiang. Some Hakka varieties in Taiwan still use the traditional Luminaries.

 Days numbered from Sunday 
Sunday comes first in order in calendars shown in the table below. In the Abrahamic tradition, the first day of the week is Sunday. Biblical Sabbath (corresponding to Saturday) is when God rested from six-day Creation, making the day following the Sabbath the first day of the week (corresponding to Sunday). Seventh-day Sabbaths were sanctified for celebration and rest. After the week was adopted in early Christianity, Sunday remained the first day of the week, but also gradually displaced Saturday as the day of celebration and rest, being considered the Lord's Day.

Saint Martin of Dumio (c. 520–580), archbishop of Braga, decided not to call days by pagan gods and to use ecclesiastic terminology to designate them. While the custom of numbering the days of the week was mostly prevalent in the Eastern Church, Portuguese, Mirandese and Galician, due to Martin's influence, are the only Romance languages in which the names of the days come from numbers rather than planetary names.

Members of the Religious Society of Friends (Quakers) historically objected to the pagan etymologies of days and months and substituted numbering, beginning with First Day for Sunday.

Icelandic is a special case within the Germanic languages, maintaining only the Sun and Moon (sunnudagur and mánudagur respectively), while dispensing with the names of the explicitly heathen gods in favour of a combination of numbered days and days whose names are linked to pious or domestic routine (föstudagur, "Fasting Day" and laugardagur, "Washing Day"). The "washing day" is also used in other North Germanic languages, but otherwise the names correspond to those of English.

 Days numbered from Saturday 
In Swahili, the day begins at sunrise, unlike in the Arabic and Hebrew calendars where the day starts at sunset (therefore an offset of twelve hours on average), and unlike in the Western world where the day starts at midnight (therefore an offset of six hours on average). Saturday is therefore the first day of the week, as it is the day that includes the first night of the week in Arabic.

Etymologically speaking, Swahili has two "fifth" days. The words for Saturday through Wednesday contain the Bantu-derived Swahili words for "one" through "five". The word for Thursday, Alhamisi, is of Arabic origin and means "the fifth" (day). The word for Friday, Ijumaa, is also Arabic and means (day of) "gathering" for the Friday noon prayers in Islam.

 Mixing of numbering and astronomy 

In the Žejane dialect of Istro-Romanian, lur (Monday) and virer (Friday) follow the Latin convention, while utorek (Tuesday), sredu (Wednesday), and četrtok (Thursday) follow the Slavic convention.

There are several systems in the different Basque dialects.

In Judaeo-Spanish (Ladino), which is mainly based on a medieval version of Spanish, the five days of Monday–Friday closely follow the Spanish names. For Sunday is used the Arabic name, which is based on numbering (meaning "Day one" or "First day"), because a Jewish language was not likely to adapt a name based on "Lord's Day" for Sunday. As in Spanish, the Ladino name for Saturday is based on Sabbath. However, as a Jewish language—and with Saturday being the actual day of rest in the Jewish community—Ladino directly adapted the Hebrew name, Shabbat.

The days of the week in Meitei language (officially known as Manipuri language) originated from the Sanamahi creation myth of Meitei mythology.

 See also 

 Akan names of the seven-day week, known as Nawotwe
 Bahá'í calendar (section Weekdays)
 Calculating the day of the week
 Week
 Work Week
 Feria

 Notes 

 Sunday 
From Latin  or Greek 

 Holy Day and First-Day of the Week (Day of the Sun -> Light -> Resurrection -> Born again) (Christianity)

 Resurrection (Christianity)

 Bazaar Day

 Market Day

 No Work

 Full good day

 Borrowed from English week

 From an Old Burmese word, not of Indic origin.

 Monday 
 After No Work

 After Bazaar

 Head of Week

 Master (as in Pir, because Muhammad was born on a Monday)

 From an Old Burmese word, not of Indic origin.

 First day of the week

 Tuesday 
 Thing (Assembly), of which god Tyr/Ziu was the patron.

 Second day of the week (cf. Hungarian  'two')

 Third day of the week.

 From Arabic  'third day'

 From Proto-Slavic  'second'

 Wednesday 
 Mid-week or Middle

 The First Fast (Christianity)

 Third day of the week

 Thursday 
 The day between two fasts (An Dé idir dhá aoin, contracted to An Déardaoin) (Christianity)

 Five (Arabic)

 Fifth day of the week.

 Fourth day of the week.

 Friday 
 The Fast (Celtic) or Fasting Day (Icelandic) (Christianity)

Good Friday or Preparation (Christianity)

 Jumu'ah (Friday Prayer)

 Gathering/Assembly/Meeting (Islam) – in Malta with no Islamic connotations

 Fifth day of the week

 Borrowed from Germanic languages
 
Or canàbara, cenàbara, cenàbera, cenàbura, cenarba, chenàbara, chenabra, chenapra, chenàpura, chenarpa, chenàura, cianàbara, chenabura; meaning holy supper as preparation to the sabbathday(Saturday)

 Saturday 
 Shabbat  (Jewish and Christian Sabbath)

 Wash or Bath day

 Sun-eve (Eve of Sunday)

 After the Gathering (Islam)

 End of the Week (Arabic  'rest')

 Week

 Half good day

 Half day

 Notes 

 References 

 Further reading 
 
 
 Neugebauer, Otto (1979). Ethiopic astronomy and computus, Österreichische Akademie der Wissenschaften, philosophisch-historische klasse, sitzungsberichte, 347''' (Vienna)

Names of units of time

History of astrology
Days of the week
Legacy of the Roman Empire